is a city located in Nagano Prefecture, Japan. , the city had an estimated population of 48,972 in 20698 households, and a population density of 452 persons per km².

History
The shores of Lake Suwa have been inhabited since at least the Japanese Paleolithic period. The Suwa clan ruled the area since the Nara period, and the area developed as a castle town for Suwa Domain under the Edo period Tokugawa shogunate and as a post station on the Kōshū Kaidō highway. In the post-Meiji restoration cadastral reforms of April 1, 1889, the village of Kamisuwa was established. Kawasuwa was elevated to town status on April 20, 1891. After merger with the  villages of Shiga and Toyoda (from Suwa District), Kamisuwa was elevated to city status on August 10, 1941, changing its name to Suwa.

Geography
Suwa is located in central Nagano Prefecture, bordered on the north and west by Lake Suwa, approximately 100 kilometers south of the prefectural capital of Nagano city, and two hours by car from either central Tokyo or Nagoya.

Surrounding municipalities
Nagano Prefecture
 Okaya
 Chino
 Ina
 Tatsuno
 Minowa
 Shimosuwa
 Nagawa

Climate
The city has a climate characterized by characterized by hot and humid summers, and relatively mild winters (Köppen climate classification Dfa).

Demographics
Per Japanese census data, the population of Suwa peaked around the year 2000 and has declined since.

Government
Suwa has a mayor-council form of government with a directly elected mayor and a unicameral city legislature of 15 members.

Economy
The Suwa region is the leading industrial area of Nagano and was once known as "The Oriental Switzerland" in Japan for its highly developed precision machinery industry. Seiko Epson Corporation, a manufacturer of information-related equipment and Seiko timepieces, is headquartered in Suwa. The area is also a popular tourist destination, noted for its hot spring resorts.

Education
Suwa has seven public elementary schools and four public middle schools operated by the city government, and two public high schools and one combined middle/high school operated by the Nagano Prefectural Board of Education. The Japanese Red Cross Society Suwa School of Nursing is also located in the city.

Colégio Sal e Luz, a Brazilian school, was previously located in Suwa. It moved to Okaya.

Transportation

Railway
 East Japan Railway Company - Chūō Main Line

Highway
 Chūō Expressway

International relations
 - St. Louis, Missouri, USA, sister city since September 23, 1974
 - Amboise, France, sister city since March 4, 1987
 - Kundl, Tirol, Austria
 - Wörgl, Tirol, Austria

Local attractions
 Takashima Castle (高島城 Takashima-jō). The castle is also known as ’The Floating Castle of Suwa’ (諏訪の浮城 Suwa-no-uki-shirō) or Shimazaki Castle (島崎城 Shimazaki-jō).
 Sunritz Hattori Museum of Arts
 Onbashira (literally, "the honored log") festival held every six years (in the years of the Tiger and the Monkey). As part of the event, very large trees up in the hills are felled and brought down into the valley, pulling them with ropes and sliding them down hills. To demonstrate their bravery, young men from the area ride on the logs as they hurtle down the slopes.

In popular media
Suwa forms the backdrop for much of Sayo Masuda's Autobiography of a Geisha.

The characters Sanae Kochiya, Kanako Yasaka, and Suwako Moriya from the Touhou Project originate from this area.

Notable people from Suwa
Sakuhei Fujiwhara, meteorologist
George Iida, movie director, author
Akira Kinoshita, photographer
Tetsuzan Nagata, general in the Imperial Japanese Army
Kenichi Mikawa, singer
Mari Kaneko, female karateka and mixed martial arts (MMA) fighter

See also
Lake Suwa

References

External links

Official Website 

 
Cities in Nagano Prefecture